Sliver (1991), by U.S. author Ira Levin, is a novel about the mysterious people in a privately owned high-rise apartment building in New York City, especially after a new tenant — an attractive young working woman in publishing — has moved in. The novel became the basis for the 1993 film of the same name, starring Sharon Stone, William Baldwin, Polly Walker and Tom Berenger.

Plot summary
When working woman Kay Norris makes the acquaintance of a handsome and friendly young man who lives in the same "sliver" building, she does not know at first that he is the owner. While keeping a low profile himself, he turns out to know an awful lot about the other inhabitants, including many of their secrets. It turns out that he is a modern-day Peeping Tom who, unknown to everyone, has had surveillance cameras and microphones installed in every single apartment, with his own place in the building serving as his headquarters. The novel is a murder mystery, and the beautiful heroine soon becomes a damsel in distress.

1991 American novels
American novels adapted into films
Bantam Books books
Novels by Ira Levin
Novels set in New York City
Erotic thrillers